Dolly Aunty Ka Dream Villa is a Pakistani sitcom series produced by Aamir Qureshi. The cast includes veteran Indian actress Farida Jalal, Talat Hussain, Aamir Qureshi, Jana Malik, Ayesha Gul, Ayaz Ahmed and Armeena Khan in pivotal roles.

Cast
Farida Jalal as Dolly Aunty
Talat Hussain as Akhtar Nazeer Malik aka Colonel
Aamir Qureshi as Armaan
Ayesha Gul as Gulbadan
Jana Malik as Samia
Ayaz Ahmed as Ajay
Armeena Khan as Preeti
Fahad Sherwani as Chef Zuben

References

Geo TV original programming
Pakistani drama television series